Philip the Handsome may refer to:

 Philip I of Castile
 Philip IV of France